Carlos Agostinho Moreira Martins (born 22 January 1973) is a retired Portuguese football defender.

References

1973 births
Living people
Portuguese footballers
S.C. Freamunde players
Leça F.C. players
Gil Vicente F.C. players
Vitória F.C. players
F.C. Maia players
C.F. Estrela da Amadora players
G.D. Estoril Praia players
Association football defenders
Primeira Liga players